Dukh i Litera («Дух і літера») is a Ukrainian publishing house that was founded in 1992. It is based in National University of Kyiv-Mohyla Academy and operates on a not-for-profit basis. Dukh i Litera publishes scholarly titles in both Ukrainian and Russian, predominantly in the humanities and social sciences. Additionally, Duh i Litera focuses on publishing books concerning Ukrainian, Jewish, and French history and culture.

Duh i Litera is the foremost publisher of Jewish Studies works in Ukraine. It has produced the Ukrainian translations of the Oxford Handbook of Jewish Studies, books by Martin Buber, Elie Wiesel, Claude Lanzmann, The Black Book by Vasily Grossman and Ilya Ehrenburg (prohibited in the USSR by censorship of the Stalin times), as well as many other major publications.

Publications

Translations
Michel de Montaigne,
Jean-Jacques Rousseau
Thomas Hobbes
Henri Bergson
Emmanuel Levinas
Simone Weil
Paul Ricœur
Michel Foucault
Hannah Arendt
Christos Yannaras
Zygmunt Bauman

Ukrainian authors
Vasyl Stus
Ivan Dzyuba
Myhailyna Kotsubynska

See also
List of publishing companies of Ukraine

References

External links
Official site (Ukrainian language)
https://duh-i-litera.com/about_us_en
Judaica Institute
Kyiv Post. History, pain-strewn exhibition on Holocaust by bullets opens
Олексій Сігов: «Саме читач визначає долю книги» (Interview with Олексій Сігов, an editor of the «Дух і літера» publishing house) 

Publishing companies of Ukraine